The 1984 Rutgers Scarlet Knights football team represented Rutgers University in the 1984 NCAA Division I-A football season. In their first season under head coach Dick Anderson, the Scarlet Knights compiled a 7–3 record while competing as an independent and outscored their opponents 213 to 155. The team's statistical leaders included Erich Hochberg with 1,909 passing yards, Albert Smith with 869 rushing yards, and Andrew Baker with 533 receiving yards.

Schedule

Roster

References

Rutgers
Rutgers Scarlet Knights football seasons
Rutgers Scarlet Knights football